Aegialia conferta is a species of aphodiine dung beetle in the family Scarabaeidae. It is found in North America.

Subspecies
These two subspecies belong to the species Aegialia conferta:
 Aegialia conferta conferta g
 Aegialia conferta nigrella Brown, 1931 c g
Data sources: i = ITIS, c = Catalogue of Life, g = GBIF, b = Bugguide.net

References

Further reading

 

Scarabaeidae
Articles created by Qbugbot
Beetles described in 1871